Euryscelis suturalis is a species of beetle in the family Cerambycidae, the only species in the genus Euryscelis.

References

Clytini
Monotypic Cerambycidae genera